Me Dejé Llevar is the debut studio album by Mexican singer-songwriter Christian Nodal, released on August 25, 2017. The album was produced by Jaime Gonzalez.

Me Dejé Llevar reached number two on the Billboard Top Latin Albums chart in the United States and number seven on the Mexican Albums Chart. Four singles were released from the album: "Adiós Amor", "Probablemente", "Me Dejé Llevar", and "Te Fallé". Thom Jurek of Allmusic gave the album a positive review and called it, "lush and elegant".

The album garnered a Latin Grammy nomination for Best Ranchero Album at the 19th Annual Latin Grammy Awards in 2018, while "Probablemente", was awarded a Latin Grammy Award for Best Regional Mexican Song.

Commercial reception 
In Mexico, the album peaked at number seven on the Top 100 Mexico albums chart. In the United States, it peaked at number two on the Billboard Top Latin Albums and number one on the Billboard Regional Mexican Albums charts. The album was certified triple-platinum (Latin field) by the Recording Industry Association of America (RIAA).

Singles 
"Adiós Amor" was released as the lead single from the album on January 13, 2017. It topped the charts in El Salvador, Guatemala, Mexico, and the United States. In the United States, it was certified 21× Platinum (Latin) by the Recording Industry Association of America (RIAA) for shipments of 1,260,000 copies. "Probablemente" was the second single released on June 9, 2017. In the United States, it was certified 5× Platinum (Latin) by the Recording Industry Association of America (RIAA) for shipments of 300,000 copies. "Adiós Amor" and "Probablemente" were both nominated for Regional Mexican Song of the Year, with the former taking the recognition at the 2018 Billboard Latin Music Awards. "Me Dejé Llevar" was the third track released on October 27, 2017. "Te Fallé" was the fourth song released on May 18, 2018. In the United States, it was certified double platinum (Latin) by the Recording Industry Association of America (RIAA) for shipments of 120,000 copies.

Critical reception 

Thom Jurek of Allmusic gave the album gave the album four out of five stars and called it "lush and elegant". Jurek went on to say that Nodal "evokes traces of the great romantic singers like Vincente Fernandez, and Luis Miguel."

Me Dejé Llevar earned a Latin Grammy nomination for Best Ranchero Album at the 19th Annual Latin Grammy Awards in 2018, which went to Luis Miguel for ¡México Por Siempre!. It was nominated for Regional Mexican Album of the Year at the 2018 Billboard Latin Music Awards, while Nodal was awarded Regional Mexican Artist of the Year and New Artist of the Year.

Track listing

Chart performance

Weekly charts

Year-end charts

Certifications

See also
2017 in Latin music

References

2017 debut albums
Christian Nodal albums
Spanish-language albums
Universal Music Latino albums